Tales from Turnpike House is the seventh studio album by English alternative dance band Saint Etienne. It is a concept album in which the songs depict characters who all live in the eponymous block of flats in London.

Setting
The exact setting of the stories told by the album's setting is somewhat amorphous. The real Turnpike House is a high-rise block of flats in Goswell Road, EC1, an area of ex-council blocks between Clerkenwell and Upper Street. The band had spent a lot of time in Turnpike House, as filmmaker Paul Kelly lived there during the period in which they were collaborating on What Have You Done Today, Mervyn Day?. However, Sarah Cracknell has said that the building imagined in the album is "not nearly as smart" as the real Turnpike House. Bob Stanley has said that he imagined the album's setting to be more suburban, "probably somewhere like Croydon or possibly Ponders End". Pete Wiggs has said that his experience of living in Croydon was the inspiration for "Side Streets" and "Slow Down at the Castle" (the Castle is a water tower in Park Hill Recreation Ground). However, the title of "The Birdman of EC1" refers to the postal district in which the real Turnpike House is located.

Collaborations
The album features two tracks co-written and produced by Xenomania ("Lightning Strikes Twice" and "Stars Above Us") as well as a guest vocal from 1970s pop star David Essex on "Relocate" (Essex had earlier appeared on the Saint Etienne album So Tough via sampled dialogue from the 1973 film That'll Be the Day).

Releases
Tales from Turnpike House was released 13 June 2005 on Sanctuary Records and preceded by a single for "Side Streets" on 6 June 2005. In the United States, the album was released 24 January 2006 by Savoy Jazz. Initial quantities of the UK release came with a bonus EP of children's music titled Up the Wooden Hills. The band felt that music for young children under seven was fed into unexceptional pop music, and wanted to make music that children and parents could enjoy together. Double-disc editions of the US release included instead the Savoy Nu Groove Sampler, containing six tracks from various Savoy Jazz releases, including "Side Streets" from the album itself.

As part of the reissue programme of all Saint Etienne's albums, Tales from Turnpike House was re-released in a deluxe double CD edition featuring unreleased material and sleeve notes by Jeremy Deller in October 2010.

Critical reception

Tales from Turnpike House was very well-received from critics, holding an aggregate 79 out of 100 from Metacritic based on 22 reviews. The album's most favourable reviews, including a five-star review from Dorlan Lynskey of The Guardian, called it the group's best album yet, with praise going towards the album's songwriting, production, arrangements, sound, vocal harmonies and Sarah Cracknell's vocals. Ernesto Lechner wrote in his review for the Los Angeles Times that "If it's pop craftsmanship you are after, few can equal this melancholy concept album and the sheer virtuosity of its hooks", while Stylus Magazine's Edward Oculicz called it an "overwhelmingly forward, ambitious album for a group fifteen years into their career and long past their commercial prime who could have quite happily introduced no new ideas—musical or thematical—and not challenged their dwindling but loyal fan-base."

Allmusic journalist Andy Kellman called it the band's most organic release since their fourth album Good Humor, highlighting Turnpike's concept as allowing "for a range of material that's as broad as what can be heard on any other Saint Etienne album." Peter Relic of Rolling Stone, who also noted the variety of musical styles, called the record "an unabashedly joyful celebration of being British" that "could make an Anglophile out of anyone."

In a less positive review, Thomas Blatchford of Drowned in Sound called Tales from Turnpike House "A good enough record, but we know they can do better." He felt the harmonies were "over-egged" and not complementary to Cracknell's lead vocals, and described the concept as difficult to grasp it due to it being "too downbeat to be uplifting and too uplifting to be downbeat". However, a reviewer from Q was the most negative towards the album. He found Saint Etienne's brand of indie disco "dated" and bashed the lyrical content as "a concept album of kitchen-sink dramas about Tony The Milkman and Doris The Housewife".

Track listing

 The Japanese edition includes two B-sides from the "Side Streets" single in the middle of the track listing.

 The US edition contains a considerably rearranged track listing, adding some songs while removing others. "I'm Falling" is a B-side from the second single, "A Good Thing".

 The 2010 deluxe edition included the original UK release of the album and a second disc consisting of rare and unreleased material. The three exclusive tracks from the US release were "mistakenly" left off the 2010 deluxe edition, but appeared on the 2011 single-disc reissue.

Personnel
Saint Etienne
 Pete Wiggs
 Bob Stanley
 Sarah Cracknell

Additional personnel
 David Essex – additional vocals
 Shawn Lee – help
 Hugh McDowell – help
 Tony Rivers and Anthony Rivers – vocal arrangements and all male harmony vocals

B-sides

from "Side Streets"

 "The Leyton Art Inferno"
 "Got A Job"
 "You Can Judge A Book By It's Cover"
 "Murder in E Minor"

from "A Good Thing"

 "I'm Falling"
 "Missing Persons Bureau"
 "Book Norton"
 "Quiet Essex"
 "A Good Thing" (Das Germanwings Mix)

Charts

References

2005 albums
Concept albums
Saint Etienne (band) albums
Sanctuary Records albums